Sefrioui is a surname. Notable people with the surname include: 

Ahmed Sefrioui (1915–2004), Moroccan novelist
Anas Sefrioui (born 1957), Moroccan businessman